The 1913 AAFA Cup featured twenty-four teams from the southern New England region. However, by that time, the AAFA was gaining a national membership and in April 1913, the AAFA was instrumental in forming the United States Football Association which became the U.S. governing body.   While the AAFA ran its cup that year, awarding the Dewar Trophy to the winner, that was the last year of competition. In 1914, the USFA began the National Challenge Cup. The Dewar Cup was also donated to the USFA which awarded it to the Challenge Cup victor.

Bracket

First round
The first round was played on October 27, 1912.
Yonkers 3-0 St. George United - Yonkers, NY
Hibernians 1-1 Holy Cross - Montgomery Park, Jersey City
(replay) Holy Cross 3-0 Hibernian - Park View Oval, Newark November 3
St. George 2-1 Clan Mackenzie - Marquette Oval, Brooklyn (protested)
(replay) St. George 1-0 Clan Mackenzie - Marquette Oval, Brooklyn November 17
Sheffield 3-0 Columbia Oval - Park View Oval, Newark
(replay) Sheffield 2-1 Columbia Oval - Van Cortlandt Park November 3
Brooklyn Celtic 1-0 Newark - Morris Park, Newark
Fulton 1-0 Eureka - Eureka Park, NY
Clan MacDonald 7-0 Bayonne Thistles - Bayonne, NJ
Cameron 2-1 Greenpoint Rovers - Hawthorne Oval, Brooklyn
Byes- Hollywood Inn (Yonkers), Critchley (Brooklyn), Washington, German, New York Celtic, Clan MacDuff, Anglo-Saxon, White Rose (Astoria).

a) aggregate after 3 games

Final

Lineups:Yonkers- Raitt, Dearns, Stewart, Kerr(c), Hill, Dennison, Waldron, McQueen, Kydd, King, Whitehouse.Hollywood Inn- McCormack, Taylor, Martin, Ewen, Gibb, Butler, McLeod, Campion, McNeill, Lawrie, Salmond.
</ref>

See also
1913 American Cup

Main bibliography
Yonkers Daily News

References

Defunct soccer competitions in the United States
Soccer cup competitions in the United States
1912–13 in American soccer